Temple Kol Ami may refer to:

Temple Kol Ami (Fort Mill, South Carolina)
Temple Kol Ami (Thornhill, Ontario)
Congregation Kol Ami (Salt Lake City, Utah)